DNB A/S The Bank’s head office is located in Copenhagen, while the Bank has operations in Estonia, Latvia, Lithuania. The latter three operate as subsidiaries of the bank. Bank DnB NORD Group has approx. 3,100 employees, 930,000 customers and a consolidated balance sheet of approx. EUR 10.0 billion.

DNB Banka
DNB Banka is one of Latvia's leading universal banks in terms of assets, deposits and loan portfolio size, providing its customers - both private individuals and legal entities - with competitive financial products and services and a high level of service through its extensive branch network.
The shareholder of DNB Banka is DNB - the leading financial group in Norway and a significant participant in the Scandinavian financial market. The Norwegian government holds 34% of DnB NOR shares.
DNB is a market leader in the area of loans and deposits, funding, asset management, life insurance and pension funds, payments and financial services, real estate transactions as well as all services related the capital market of Norway.

Shareholders
50% of the bank shares are owned by DNB Bank ASA. About 34% of the shares are owned by the Norwegian government.

Involvement in spam transactions
In early 2011 a team from the University of California-San Diego, the University of California-Berkeley, and the Budapest University of Technology and Economics investigated spam emails by test transactions. DnB NORD was observed to be third of three banks that provide payment services for 95% of all the spam purchases.

Later that May, DnB NORD indicated  that they bought a bank which had customers engaging in spam activities and had terminated their relationship with the customer.

See also

References

External links
 Bank DNB A/S website
 DNB Bankas website in Lithuania
 DNB Banka website in Latvia
 DNB corporate website
 Information on DNB bank

DNB ASA
Banks of Norway
Banks established in 2006
2006 establishments in Denmark
Companies based in Copenhagen